This article include details of 2011 AFC U-19 Women's Championship qualification.

First round 
Each group winner will advance to the Second round.

Group A 
All matches were held in Makati, Philippines (UTC+8).

 Note: Hong Kong withdrew before playing any matches.

Group B 
All matches were held in Dhaka, Bangladesh (UTC+6).

Second round 
All matches were held Kuala Lumpur, Malaysia (UTC+8).

References 

AFC U-19 Women's Championship qualification
Qual
qualification
AFc
2011 in youth sport